Haapus is a Marathi film released on 25 June 2010. The movie has been produced by Sanjay Chhabria along with Abhijeet Satam who has also directed it.

Plot
Haapus throws light on an important aspect the life of Malwani People.  'Haapus' is a Marathi film based on the farmers who are engaged in the cultivation of Haapus Aamba (Alphonso Mangoes) in Konkan area of Maharashtra, India. Basically it is a story about one family from a village where the young son of an astrologer wants to break the vicious circle of the mango-farmers getting peanuts from a rich business man who earns millions in the market, and to do so he has to contend with his father's immense belief in astrology. It is a light-hearted comedy, which people of all age groups can enjoy.

Anna Gurav is terror personified! In Wanarwadi, in the picturesque Konkan, Anna’s word is the LAW- because of his command over Astrology. But he is loggerheads with Ajit, his only son who has developed a new breed of mangoes - the major bread-earner of this region.
The Gurav family also has twin daughters - AMRUTA, the rebellious one and ANKITA, the docile one who is in love with the local rickshaw driver SUBHYA. Enter school teacher DIGAMBER KALE, from Aambejogai Marathwada, who soon becomes an integral part of the Gurav family.

Ajit wants to break the vicious circle of the mango-farmers getting peanuts from the CHAJED who earns millions in the Market. Anna opposes his view of going into the market himself with the mangoes as Anna’s astrology says that this business is not conducive to the Gurav Family.

Cast
 Shivaji Satam as Anna Gurav
 Makarand Anaspure as Digambar Kale
 Subodh Bhave as Ajit
 Madhura Velankar as Ankita and Amruta (Double role)
 Pushkar Shrotri as Subhya
 Sulabha Deshpande as Grandmother
 Mrunal Deshpande
 Manasi Magikar
 Vidyadhar Joshi
 Swarasha Jadhav as Aanadi
 Sunil Deo

Music
The music for the film is composed by Salil Kulkarni on lyrics by Sandeep Khare.

References

External links
 

2010s Marathi-language films
Mangoes
Films about astrology